Heraclides (born Cyprus, fl. 403), was a bishop of Ephesus.

References

5th-century Byzantine bishops
Bishops of Ephesus
Ancient Cypriots